Willem van de Sande Bakhuyzen (Arnhem, 13 November 1957 – Amsterdam, 27 September 2005) was a Dutch film director.

He made his acting debut in the 1986 Academy Award-winning movie The Assault. His directing debut came in 1990, with the television series . He directed 16 movies in his career, many of which received international praise. His movies won 21 awards and were nominated for an additional 11 awards. Of these, six awards and three nominations were for the Golden Calves. His 2001 art film Touch and his 2002 television movie The Enclave were nominated for an Emmy Award. Van de Sande Bakhuyzen died from cancer in 2005, the day before the premiere of his movie Life!.

Filmography

Actor
 The Assault (1986; original title De Aanslag)
 De Orionnevel (1987)

Director
 Sop (1999; film for television)
 Zin (2001; film for television)
 Touch (2001; original title Lost)
 Family (2001; original title Familie)
 Kaas en noten (2002; film for television)
 The Enclave (2002; original title De Enclave, film for television)
 Hotel Bellevue (2003; film for television)
 Cloaca (2003; film for television)
 Embracing Time (2004; film for television)
 Lepel (2005)
 Leef! (2005)
 Ik Omhels Je Met 1000 Armen (2006)

External links

 

1957 births
2005 deaths
Deaths from colorectal cancer
Dutch film directors
People from Arnhem
Golden Calf winners
Deaths from cancer in the Netherlands
Maastricht Academy of Dramatic Arts alumni